Dzhokhar "Jahar" Anzorovich Tsarnaev (born July 22, 1993) is a Kyrgyz-American terrorist of Chechen descent. Tsarnaev was convicted of perpetrating the Boston Marathon bombing by planting pressure cooker bombs near the finish line of the race on April 15, 2013, along with his older brother Tamerlan Tsarnaev. The bombings killed three people and injured 281 others.

Tsarnaev and his family had traveled to the United States on a tourist visa and subsequently claimed asylum during their stay in 2002. He became a naturalized U.S. citizen on September 11, 2012. At the time of the bombings, Tsarnaev was a student at University of Massachusetts Dartmouth. Previously, Tsarnaev had attended Cambridge Rindge and Latin School.

Following the bombings, on April 18, the Tsarnaev brothers shot and killed MIT Police Officer Sean Collier in a failed attempt to steal his firearm. Later that night, they engaged in a shootout with the police. Tamerlan was killed and a Massachusetts Bay Transportation Authority Police officer was critically injured in the course of the escape in an SUV. Dzhokhar was injured but escaped, and a manhunt ensued, with thousands of police searching a 20-block area of Watertown, Massachusetts.

On the evening of April 19,  Tsarnaev was found seriously wounded and unarmed hiding in a boat on a trailer in Watertown just outside the police perimeter. After the police opened fire at the boat, they arrested him and took him to Beth Israel Deaconess Medical Center. Tsarnaev was charged on April 22 with using and conspiring to use a weapon of mass destruction resulting in death and with malicious destruction of property resulting in death. Tsarnaev later said during questioning that the brothers next intended to detonate explosives in Times Square in New York City. Tsarnaev reportedly also told authorities that he and his brother were inspired, at least in part, by watching lectures by Anwar al-Awlaki. He was convicted on April 8, 2015 and sentenced to death on June 24, 2015. His death sentence was vacated on appeal in July 2020, but the U.S. Supreme Court reversed this decision in March 2022.

Personal background

Family background
The Tsarnaev family was forcibly moved from Chechnya by the Soviet Union to the Soviet republic of Kyrgyzstan in the years following World War II. Dzhokhar Tsarnaev's father, Anzor Tsarnaev, is a Chechen, and his mother, Zubeidat Tsarnaeva, is an Avar. The couple had two sons, Tamerlan, born in the Kalmyk Autonomous Soviet Socialist Republic in 1986, and Dzhokhar, born in Kyrgyzstan in 1993. The parents also have two daughters. Anzor is a Muslim who shuns extremism and raised his children as Muslims.

As children, Tamerlan and Dzhokhar lived in Tokmok, Kyrgyzstan. In 2001, the family moved to Makhachkala, Dagestan, in the Russian Federation. In April 2002, the Tsarnaev parents and Dzhokhar went to the United States on a 90-day tourist visa. Anzor Tsarnaev applied for asylum, citing fears of deadly persecution due to his ties to Chechnya.

Tamerlan was left in the care of his uncle Ruslan in Kyrgyzstan and arrived in the U.S. about two years later. In the U.S. the parents received asylum and then filed for their four children, who received "derivative asylum status". They settled on Norfolk Street in Cambridge, Massachusetts. Tamerlan lived there until his death.

The family "was in constant transition" for the next decade. Anzor Tsarnaev and Zubeidat Tsarnaeva both received welfare benefits. The father worked as a backyard mechanic and the mother worked as a cosmetologist until she lost her job for refusing to work in a business that served men. In March 2007, the family was granted legal permanent residence.

Early life
Tsarnaev was born in Kyrgyzstan on July 22, 1993. As a child, he emigrated with his family to Russia and then, when he was eight years old, to the United States under political asylum. The family settled in Cambridge and became U.S. permanent residents in March 2007. Dzhokhar became a U.S. citizen on September 11, 2012, while in college. His mother, Zubeidat, also became a U.S. citizen, but it is not clear if his father, Anzor, ever did. Tamerlan, his brother, was unable to naturalize expeditiously due to an investigation against him, which held up the citizenship process. Dzhokhar attended Cambridgeport Elementary School and Cambridge Community Charter School's middle school program. At Cambridge Rindge and Latin School, a public high school, he was an avid wrestler and a Greater Boston League winter all-star. He sometimes worked as a lifeguard at Harvard University.

In 2011, he contacted a professor at the University of Massachusetts Dartmouth who taught a class about Chechen history, expressing his interest in the topic. He graduated from high school in 2011 and the city of Cambridge awarded him a $2,500 scholarship that year. His brother's boxing coach, who had not seen them in a few years at the time of the bombings, said that "the young brother was like a puppy dog, following his older brother."

Life as a university student
Tsarnaev enrolled at the University of Massachusetts Dartmouth in September 2011. He started with a marine biology major with the intent on becoming a director but later changed to nursing.

Tsarnaev was described as "normal" and popular among fellow students. His friends said he sometimes smoked marijuana, liked hip hop, and did not talk to them about politics. Many friends and other acquaintances found it inconceivable that he could be one of the two bombers at first, calling it "completely out of his character". He was not perceived as foreign, spoke English without a [foreign] accent, was sociable, and was described by peers as "[not] 'them'. He was 'us'. He was Cambridge."

On the Russian-language social-networking site VK, Tsarnaev described his "world view" as "Islam" and his personal priorities as "career and money". He posted links to Islamic websites, links to videos of fighters in the Syrian civil war, and links to pages advocating independence for Chechnya. Dzhokhar was also active on Twitter. According to The Economist, he seemed "to have been much more concerned with sport and cheeseburgers than with religion, at least judging by his Twitter feed"; however, according to The Boston Globe, on the day of the 2012 Boston Marathon, a year before the bombings, a post on Tsarnaev's Twitter feed mentioned a Quran verse often used by radical Muslim clerics and propagandists.

In 2012, Arlington Police ran a warrant check on Tsarnaev and checked his green Honda when they were investigating a report of underage drinking at a party in Arlington Heights.

At the time of the bombing, Tsarnaev was a sophomore living in the UMass Dartmouth's Pine Dale Hall dorm. He was struggling academically, having a 1.09 GPA and receiving seven failing grades over three semesters, including Fs in Principles of Modern Chemistry, Introduction to American Politics, and Chemistry and the Environment and had an unpaid bill of $20,000 to the university. He was known to be selling marijuana to make money.

2011 Waltham triple murder

A triple homicide was committed in Waltham, Massachusetts, on the evening of September 11, 2011. After the 2013 Boston Marathon bombings, the case was re-examined and authorities said that the Tsarnaev brothers might have been responsible for the murders, that forensic evidence connected them to the scene of the killings, and that their cell phone records placed them in the area at the time of the killings. A crucial event happened in May 2013 when Ibragim Todashev, a 27-year-old Chechen native and former mixed martial arts fighter who knew Tamerlan Tsarnaev, was shot and killed in Orlando, Florida, by law enforcement officers who had been interviewing him about the bombings and the Waltham murders. The FBI alleged that just before he was killed, Todashev made statements implicating both himself and Tamerlan Tsarnaev in the Waltham murders—saying that the initial crime was a drug-related robbery and that the murders were committed to prevent being identified by the victims.

2013 Boston Marathon bombing

Dzhokhar Tsarnaev was convicted of participating, along with his brother Tamerlan Tsarnaev, in the Boston Marathon Bombing on April 15, 2013. He reportedly "told the FBI that he and his brother were angry about the U.S. wars in Afghanistan and Iraq and the killing of Muslims there."

That day, images of Dzhokhar were captured on CCTV near the finish line pushing his way through spectators towards the front carrying a duffel bag that was later determined to contain one of two pressure cooker bombs that would detonate. Tsarnaev appeared to place the bag down without causing any suspicion amongst spectators and then appeared to watch some marathon runners cross the finish line before hurrying away moments before the bomb exploded. The explosion caused mass panic among spectators and marathon runners. Shortly after the second bomb exploded, CCTV cameras recorded video of both Tsarnaev brothers running away from the scene along with the crowd.

Tsarnaev continued to tweet after the bombings, and sent a tweet telling the people of Boston to "stay safe". He returned to his university after the April 15 bombing and remained there until April 18, when the FBI released pictures of him and Tamerlan at the marathon. During that time, he used the college gym and slept in his dorm; his friends said that he partied with them after the attacks and looked "relaxed".

MIT killing, carjacking, firefight, and manhunt
Tsarnaev and his brother murdered MIT police officer Sean Collier on April 18, 2013, at the MIT campus in a failed attempt to steal his gun, before traveling to the Boston neighborhood of Allston. There, the brothers carjacked an SUV and robbed the owner. However, the owner of the car said he managed to escape when the Tsarnaevs became momentarily distracted in the process of refueling the car at a cash-only gas station. Dun Meng, who originally did not give his name to the media but said he goes by the name "Danny", said he fled to another nearby gas station and contacted the police. Police were then able to track the location of the car through the man's cellphone and the SUV's anti-theft tracking device.

When police found the stolen SUV and a Honda being driven by the brothers in the early hours of April 19, the suspects engaged in a shootout with police in Watertown. During the gunfight, in which bombs were thrown at responding officers, Dzhokhar Tsarnaev was wounded while Tamerlan was shot a number of times before being apprehended. Police say that Dzhokhar escaped by driving the stolen SUV toward the officers who were arresting his brother. An unprecedented manhunt ensued involving thousands of police officers from several nearby towns as well as state police, FBI, and SWAT teams, who searched numerous homes and property inside a 10-block perimeter. Warrants were not issued, but residents reported they were told they must allow the searches to go forward. Many reported being instructed to leave their homes as well. Images of squad cars and large black armored vehicles crowding the side streets, and videos of residents being led out of their homes at gunpoint soon flooded social media. The Boston metro area was effectively shut down all day on April 19.

After Tsarnaev's name was published in connection with the bombings, his uncle Ruslan Tsarni, who lives in Montgomery Village, Maryland, pleaded with Tsarnaev through television to turn himself in "and ask for forgiveness", and said that he had shamed the family and the Chechen ethnicity.

Arrest and detention

David Henneberry, the owner of the boat, had noticed that the cover on the boat was loose and when the "shelter in place" order was lifted, went outside to investigate. He lifted the tarpaulin, saw a bloodied man, retreated into his house and called 911. Three Boston police officers responded and were soon joined by Waltham police. Tsarnaev's presence and movement were later verified through a forward looking infrared thermal imaging device in a State Police helicopter. The suspect was observed pushing up at the tarp on the boat and Boston police began directing a large volume of gunfire at the suspect, stopping only after calls from the superintendent on the scene. After initial reports of a shootout between police and Tsarnaev, two U.S. officials said on April 24 that Dzhokhar was unarmed when captured.

Tsarnaev, who had been shot and was bleeding badly from wounds to his left ear, neck and thigh, was taken into federal custody after the standoff. Initial reports that the neck wound was from a self-inflicted gunshot due to a possible suicide attempt were later contradicted by the revelation that he was unarmed at the time of capture and a description of the neck wound by SWAT team members that identified it as a slicing injury, possibly caused by shrapnel from an explosion.

In an image broadcast on the night of his arrest, he was shown stepping out of the boat in which he had been hiding. Other sources described him "lying on his stomach, straddling the side of the boat (…) His left arm and left leg hung over the boat's side. He appeared to struggle for consciousness." Then he was "hauled down to the grassy ground" by SWAT officer Jeff Campbell and handcuffed by SWAT officer Saro Thompson. In a photograph he can be seen lying on the ground on his back with his hands cuffed behind him, being helped by medical staff.

He was taken to Beth Israel Deaconess Medical Center in Boston, where he was treated for severe injuries in the intensive-care unit. He was in serious but stable condition (updated to "fair" on April 23), and unable to speak because of the wound to his throat. According to one of the nurses, he had cried for two days straight after waking up. He responded to authorities in writing and by nodding his head, although he did manage to say the word "no" when asked if he could afford a lawyer. Court documents released in August 2013, show that Tsarnaev had a skull fracture and gunshot wounds prior to being taken into custody. According to a doctor that treated him, Tsarnaev had a skull-base fracture, with injuries to the middle ear, the skull base, the lateral portion of his C1 vertebra, with a significant soft tissue injury, as well as injury to the pharynx, the mouth, and a small vascular injury.

Tsarnaev had written a message on the inside of the boat; according to Ray McGovern in Consortium News he said "The [Boston] bombings were in retribution for the U.S. crimes in places like Iraq and Afghanistan [and] that the victims of the Boston bombing were collateral damage, in the same way innocent victims have been collateral damage in U.S. wars around the world."

On April 26, Tsarnaev was transported by U.S. Marshals to the Federal Medical Center, Devens, a United States federal prison near Boston for male inmates requiring specialized or long-term medical or mental health care. He was held in solitary confinement in a segregated housing unit with 23-hour-per-day lockdown.

Rolling Stone magazine

Tsarnaev was the subject of a cover story for an August 2013 issue of Rolling Stone entitled "The Bomber: How a Popular, Promising Student Was Failed by His Family, Fell into Radical Islam and Became a Monster." The magazine drew heavy criticism for the flattering photo of Tsarnaev on the issue's cover. Boston Mayor Tom Menino wrote that the cover "rewards a terrorist with celebrity treatment." Massachusetts State Police sergeant Sean Murphy said that "glamorizing the face of terror is not just insulting to the family members of those killed in the line of duty; it also could be an incentive to those who may be unstable to do something to get their face on the cover of Rolling Stone magazine". The New York Times used the same photo on their front page in May 2013, but did not draw criticism. Rolling Stone columnist Matt Taibbi criticized those who took offense at the cover, arguing that they associated Rolling Stone with glamour instead of news, stating that The New York Times did not draw the criticism that Rolling Stone did, "because everyone knows the Times is a news organization. Not everyone knows that about Rolling Stone… because many people out there understandably do not know that Rolling Stone is also a hard-news publication."

The editors of Rolling Stone posted the following response:

Our hearts go out to the victims of the Boston Marathon bombing, and our thoughts are always with them and their families. The cover story we are publishing this week falls within the traditions of journalism and Rolling Stones long-standing commitment to serious and thoughtful coverage of the most important political and cultural issues of our day. The fact that Dzhokhar Tsarnaev is young, and in the same age group as many of our readers, makes it all the more important for us to examine the complexities of this issue and gain a more complete understanding of how a tragedy like this happens. –THE EDITORS

Retailers such as CVS Pharmacy, BJ's Wholesale Club (which additionally announced it would no longer carry Rolling Stone)  and others, announced that they would no longer sell the issue.

Adweek magazine ranked the cover the "hottest" of the year after it doubled newsstand sales to 120,000. The cover photo was taken by Tsarnaev himself, not a professional photographer.

Legal proceedings

Questioning, charges and confessions
Initially, Tsarnaev was questioned without being read his Miranda rights, because the Justice Department invoked Miranda's public safety exception. He was to be questioned by a federal High-Value Interrogation Group, a special counterterrorism group composed of members of the FBI, CIA and Department of Defense that was created to question high-value detainees. Later, after being read his Miranda rights, Tsarnaev stopped talking and declined to continue to cooperate with the investigation.

Prosecutors initially argued for the public safety exception to be applied to the statements obtained before the Miranda rights were read. However, the exception was not considered by the court because the prosecutors later decided not to use any of that evidence in their case against Tsarnaev.

On April 22, Tsarnaev was charged with "using and conspiring to use a weapon of mass destruction resulting in death" and with "malicious destruction of properties resulting in death", both in connection with the Boston Marathon attacks. He was read his Miranda rights at his bedside by a federal magistrate judge of the United States District Court for the District of Massachusetts, nodded his head to answer the judge's questions, and answered "no" when asked whether he could afford a lawyer.

Once convicted, he was eligible to face the death penalty. He was prosecuted by assistant U.S. attorneys William Weinreb and Aloke Chakravarty, of the Anti-Terrorism and National Security Unit of the U.S. Attorney's Office in Boston. His defense team included federal public defender Miriam Conrad, William Fick, and Judy Clarke.

Middlesex County prosecutors also brought criminal charges against Tsarnaev for the murder of Sean Collier. A surveillance camera at MIT captured the brothers approaching Collier's car from behind.

After initial interrogations, officials announced that it was clear the attack was religiously motivated, but that so far there was no evidence that the brothers had any ties to Islamic terror organizations. Officials also said that Dzhokhar acknowledged his role in the bombings and told interrogators that he and Tamerlan were motivated by extremist Islamic beliefs and the U.S. wars in Afghanistan and Iraq to carry out the bombing. Dzhokhar admitted during questioning that he and his brother were planning to detonate explosives in New York City's Times Square next. The brothers formed the plan spontaneously during the April 18 carjacking, but things went awry after the vehicle ran low on gas and they forced the driver to stop at a gas station, where he escaped. Dzhokhar says he was inspired by online videos from Anwar al-Awlaki, who also inspired Faisal Shahzad, the perpetrator of the 2010 Times Square car bombing attempt.

Investigators found no evidence that Tsarnaev was involved in any jihadist activities, and, according to The Wall Street Journal, came to believe that unlike his brother Tamerlan, Dzhokhar "was never truly radicalized". Examinations of his computers did not reveal frequent visits to jihad websites, expressions of violent Islamist rhetoric or other suspicious activities. Some law enforcement officials told the WSJ that Tsarnaev "better fit[s] the psychological profile of an ordinary criminal than a committed terrorist".

On May 16, 2013, during CBS This Morning, CBS News senior correspondent John Miller said he had been told that Tsarnaev, while hiding in the boat, wrote a note claiming responsibility for the April 15 attack during the marathon. The note was scribbled with a pen on one of the inside walls of the cabin and said the bombings were payback for the U.S. military actions in Afghanistan and Iraq, and referred to the Boston victims as collateral damage, the same way Muslims have been in the American-led wars. He continued, "When you attack one Muslim, you attack all Muslims." He also said he did not mourn his brother's death because now Tamerlan was a martyr in paradise and that he (Dzhokhar) expected to join him in paradise. Miller's sources said the wall the note was written on had multiple bullet holes in it from the shots that were fired into the boat by police. According to Miller during the interview he gave on the morning show, he said that the note would be a significant piece of evidence in any Dzhokhar trial and that it is "certainly admissible", and paints a clear picture of the brothers' motive "consistent with what he told investigators while he was in custody".

Trial

Charges, pleas
Tsarnaev's arraignment for 30 charges, including four counts of murder, occurred on July 10, 2013, in federal court in Boston before U.S. magistrate judge Marianne Bowler. It was his first public court appearance. He pleaded not guilty to all 30 counts against him, which included using and conspiring to use a weapon of mass destruction resulting in death. Tsarnaev was represented by Miriam Conrad, David Bruck, William Fick, Timothy G. Watkins and Judy Clarke.

On January 30, 2014, United States Attorney General Eric Holder announced that the federal government would seek the death penalty against Tsarnaev. A plea deal failed when the government refused to rule out the possibility of the death penalty.

The trial began on January 5, 2015; Tsarnaev pleaded not guilty to all thirty charges laid against him. The proceedings were led by Judge George O'Toole. Tsarnaev's attorney Judy Clarke admitted in her opening statement that Tsarnaev committed the acts in question, but sought to avert the death penalty by showing that his brother Tamerlan was the mastermind behind the acts. Counter-terrorism expert Matthew Levitt also gave testimony.

Verdict

On April 8, 2015, Tsarnaev was found guilty on all thirty counts of the indictment. The charges of usage of a weapon of mass destruction resulting in death, in addition to aiding and abetting, made Tsarnaev eligible for the death penalty.

Bill and Denise Richard, parents of Martin Richard (the youngest of the three killed in the bombings and 1 of the 2 people killed by Dzhokhar's bomb, the other person being Chinese-exchange student Lingzi Lu), urged against a death sentence for Tsarnaev. They stated that the lengthy appeals period would force them to continually relive that day, and would rather see Tsarnaev spend life in prison without parole (possibility of release), and waive his right to appeal.

Tsarnaev, who had displayed little emotion throughout his trial, appeared to weep when his relatives testified on May 4, 2015. On May 15, 2015, the jury recommended that Tsarnaev be sentenced to death by lethal injection on six of 17 capital counts.

According to the verdict forms completed by the jurors, three of 12 believed that Tsarnaev had taken part in the attack under his brother's influence; two believed that he had been remorseful for his actions; two believed that Tamerlan, not Dzhokhar, had shot and killed Officer Collier; three believed that his friends still care about him; one believed that Tsarnaev's mother, Zubeidat Tsarnaeva, was to be blamed for the brothers' actions; one believed that Tsarnaev would never be violent again in prison.

Massachusetts ended the death penalty for state crimes in 1984. However, because Tsarnaev was tried on federal charges, he was eligible for execution.

Death sentence
On June 24, 2015, Tsarnaev faced his living victims in court as his death sentence was formally delivered. Victims and their families were able to present impact statements to the court, and Tsarnaev, who had been silent throughout his month-long trial, apologized to the injured and the bereaved in the bombings.

On death row

The following morning, on June 25, 2015, Tsarnaev was transferred to the United States Penitentiary, Florence High in Colorado; as of July 17, 2015 he had been transferred to ADX Florence. A Federal Bureau of Prisons (BOP) spokesperson stated that "unique security management requirements" caused the agency to place Tsarnaev in Colorado instead of United States Penitentiary, Terre Haute, Indiana, where male death-row inmates are normally held.

Al-Qaeda reaction
According to The Guardian, in June 2016, Al-Qaeda leader Ayman al-Zawahiri issued a threat to the United States warning of the "gravest consequences" should Tsarnaev be harmed.

Appeal and Supreme Court
Tsarnaev appealed his sentence on the grounds that the trial should not have been held in Boston, that there were errors in jury selection and that the judge improperly excluded evidence that Tamerlan Tsarnaev and another man, Ibragim Todashev, committed a prior triple murder in Waltham on September 11, 2011, arguing that such evidence would suggest that Dzhokhar Tsarnaev acted under the influence of Tamerlan Tsarnaev and was possibly fearful of what would happen to him if he refused.

The appeal was heard by a three-judge panel of the First Circuit on December 12, 2019. On July 31, 2020, the First Circuit overturned the death sentence and three of the other convictions, agreeing that the judge failed to determine how much the potential jurors had been aware of the event during jury selection, and ordered a retrial with a new jury for the penalty phase of his trial. Tsarnaev remained in prison from multiple life sentences carried by the other uncontested convictions. U.S. Circuit Judge O. Rogeriee Thompson, who wrote the opinion, clarified the ruling of the court. She stated, "Make no mistake: Dzhokhar will spend his remaining days locked up in prison, with the only matter remaining being whether he will die by execution."

On March 22, 2021, the Supreme Court agreed to consider an appeal from the Department of Justice, and on October 13, 2021, the Department of Justice presented arguments in favor of reinstating the death penalty for Tsarnaev. The Supreme Court ruled on March 4, 2022, in a 6–3 decision, that the First Circuit improperly vacated the death sentence that Tsarnaev had been given. The Court reversed the First Circuit's decision, reinstating the death penalty.

On April 7, 2022, Tsarnaev's attorney asked the First Circuit Court of Appeals to consider four constitutional claims that had not been taken up in the previous appeal in March 2021. The filing was made in response to an April 6 filing by the appeals court to comply with the previous Supreme Court ruling in March 2022.

Biographical portrayals
Alex Wolff in Patriots Day (2016): a thriller drama film about the Boston Marathon bombing and the manhunt for the Tsarnaev brothers
Stronger (2017) by David Gordon Green: a drama film that chronicles the experience of survivor Jeff Bauman.

See also 
 Capital punishment by the United States federal government
 Capital punishment in Massachusetts
 List of death row inmates in the United States

Notes

References

External links

 Tsarnaev Family (The Wall Street Journal)

American Islamists
Avar people
Chechen people
Living people
Boston Marathon bombing
Chechen Islamists
1993 births
21st-century American criminals
American spree killers
American murderers of children
American people convicted of murder
American people imprisoned on charges of terrorism
American people of Avar descent
American people of Chechen descent
American people of Dagestani descent
American prisoners sentenced to death
American shooting survivors
American wrestlers
American male criminals
Kyrgyzstani emigrants to the United States
People convicted of murder by the United States federal government
Kyrgyzstani Muslims
Kyrgyzstani people of Chechen descent
Kyrgyzstani people of Dagestani descent
People convicted on terrorism charges
People from Chüy Region
People imprisoned on charges of terrorism
Prisoners sentenced to death by the United States federal government
Inmates of ADX Florence
Islamist bombers
Kyrgyzstani expatriates in the United States
University of Massachusetts Dartmouth alumni
Cambridge Rindge and Latin School alumni
Naturalized citizens of the United States
Islamist mass murderers